The 2021 Croatia Rally (also known as the Rally Croatia 2021) was a motor racing event for rally cars that was held over four days between 22 and 25 April 2021. It marked the forty-fifth running of the Croatia Rally, and the first time the event has been run as a round of the World Rally Championship. The event was the third round of the 2021 World Rally Championship, World Rally Championship-2 and World Rally Championship-3. It was also the first round of the 2021 Junior World Rally Championship. The 2021 event was based in Zagreb in the City of Zagreb Region and was contested over twenty special stages totalling  in competitive distance.

Sébastien Ogier and Julien Ingrassia won the rally with a 0.6-second advantage over teammate Elfyn Evans and Scott Martin, which was the third closest winning margin overall after the 2011 Jordan Rally and the 2007 Rally New Zealand. Mads Østberg and Torstein Eriksen won the World Rally Championship-2 category, while Kajetan Kajetanowicz and Maciej Szczepaniak won the World Rally Championship-3 category. The British crew of Jon Armstrong and Phil Hall was the winner in the junior class.

Background

Championship standings prior to the event
Kalle Rovanperä and Jonne Halttunen entered the round with a four-point lead over Thierry Neuville and Martijn Wydaeghe. Reigning World Champions Sébastien Ogier and Julien Ingrassia were third, another four points behind. In the World Rally Championship for Manufacturers, Toyota Gazoo Racing WRT held an eleven-point lead over defending manufacturers' champions Hyundai Shell Mobis WRT, followed by M-Sport Ford WRT.

In the World Rally Championship-2 standings, Andreas Mikkelsen and Ola Fløene held a twenty-four-point lead ahead of Esapekka Lappi and Janne Ferm in the drivers' and co-drivers' standings respectively, with Adrien Fourmaux and Renaud Jamoul in third. In the teams' championship, Toksport WRT and Movisport co-led the standings, with M-Sport Ford WRT in third.

In the World Rally Championship-3 standings, the crew of Yohan Rossel and Benoît Fulcrand and of Teemu Asunmaa and Marko Salminen both led championships, with Egon Kaur and Silver Simm in third, trailing by five points.

Entry list
The following crews were entered into the rally. The event was open to crews competing in the World Rally Championship, its support categories, the World Rally Championship-2 and World Rally Championship-3, Junior World Rally Championship and privateer entries that were not registered to score points in any championship. Twelve entries for the World Rally Championship were received, as were seven in the World Rally Championship-2 and fifteen in the World Rally Championship-3. A further eight crews entered the Junior World Rally Championship in Ford Fiesta Rally4s.

Route

Itinerary
All dates and times are CEST (UTC+2).

Report

World Rally Cars
Neuville and Wydaeghe led the rally at the end of the first day, while Rovanpera crashed on the initial stage. Ogier took the 600th stage win of his World Rally Championship career.

Classification

Special stages

Championship standings

World Rally Championship-2

Classification

Special stages

Championship standings

World Rally Championship-3

Classification

Special stages

Championship standings

Junior World Rally Championship

Classification

Special stages

Championship standings

Notes

References

External links

  
 2021 Croatia Rally at eWRC-results.com
 The official website of the World Rally Championship

2021
2021 in Croatian sport
2021 World Rally Championship season
April 2021 sports events in Croatia